Thomas Lindrup (born 21 May 1976) is a former Danish professional football winger.

He previously played for Danish Superliga sides FC Nordsjælland, AGF, OB and Brøndby IF. He was capped twice for Denmark's U19 team.

External links
Danish national team profile
 Boldklubben Frem profile
 Brøndby IF profile
Career statistics at Danmarks Radio

1976 births
Living people
Danish men's footballers
Brøndby IF players
Odense Boldklub players
Aarhus Gymnastikforening players
FC Nordsjælland players
Hvidovre IF players
Boldklubben Frem players
Danish Superliga players
Association football midfielders